Thomas Hussey (1749–1824), of Rathkenny, co. Meath and Fulmer, Buckinghamshire, was an English politician.

He married Mary Walpole, daughter of Horatio Walpole, 2nd Baron Walpole.

Career
He was a Member (MP) of the Parliament of England for Aylesbury 14 February 1809 - November 1814.

References

1749 births
1824 deaths
Politicians from County Meath
People from South Bucks District
Members of the Parliament of the United Kingdom for English constituencies
UK MPs 1807–1812
UK MPs 1812–1818